Carson Henry Smith Jr. (born ) is an American politician who is a Republican member of the North Carolina House of Representatives, having been initially elected in 2018. He has represented the 16th district (which includes all of Pender County and parts of Columbus County) since 2019. Smith previously served as sheriff of Pender County, from 2002 until 2018.

In March 2020, during the COVID-19 pandemic, Smith was appointed as interim Emergency Management Director of Pender County after the sudden resignation of Chuck Tear (who had held the post for three months at the time of his resignation). Smith had previously served as Emergency Management Director for the county prior to his first term as sheriff in 2002.

Electoral history

2020

2018

2014

2010

Committee assignments

2021-2022 Session
Appropriations (Vice Chair)
Appropriations - Justice and Public Safety (Chair)
Pensions and Retirement (Vice Chair)
Judiciary II 
Marine Resources and Aqua Culture 
Wildlife Resources

2019-2020 Session
Appropriations 
Appropriations - Capital 
Health 
Pensions and Retirement
Judiciary

References

External links

Living people
1960s births
Politicians from Wilmington, North Carolina
Republican Party members of the North Carolina House of Representatives
People from Pender County, North Carolina